Mukund Ramrao Jayakar (M.R. Jayakar) (13 November 1873 – 10 March 1959, Bombay) was the first Vice-Chancellor of the University of Poona. He was a lawyer, scholar and politician. He was a prominent freedom fighter.

Jayakar was born in a Marathi Pathare Prabhu family.

Jayakar studied LL.B. in Bombay in 1902 and became a barrister in 1905 at London. In 1905 he was enrolled as advocate of the Bombay High Court. He was Director of The Bombay Chronicle along with Jinnah.

He was a member of the Bombay Legislative Council during 1923–1925, and a leader of the Swaraj Party. He also became member of Central Legislative Assembly. In 1937 he became Judge of the Federal Court of India at Delhi. In December 1946, he joined the Constituent Assembly of India. He was also the chairman of the Indian Road Development Committee, formed in 1927 to report recommendations regarding highway development. He was a member of the Hindu Mahasabha. He took part in the All Parties Conference in 1928, and was pivotal in denying demands of the Muslim League put forward by Muhammad Ali Jinnah.

 
He was also Chairman of the Advisory Board of Kaivalyadhama Yoga Institute.

He died on 10 March 1959 at Bombay at the age of 86.

Writings 
Published works:

Social Reform and Social Service (Madras: Theosophical Society, 1917)

(ed.) Kirtikar, V. J., Studies in Vedanta (Bombay: Taraporevala, 1924)

The Story of My Life (Bombay: Asia Publishing House, 1958)

Contributions to periodicals:

Letter to Times of India, 22 May 1931, criticising India Society and promotion of Bengal school of art

Secondary works:

Bakshi, S. R. (ed.), M. R. Jayakar (New Delhi: Anmol, 1994)

Brown, Judith M., Gandhi’s Rise to Power (Cambridge: Cambridge University Press, 1972)

Dhanki, Joginder Singh (ed.), Perspectives on Indian National Movement: Selected Correspondence of Lala Lajpat Rai (New Delhi: National Book Organisation, 1998)

Israel, Milton, Communications and Power: Propaganda and the Press in the Indian Nationalist Struggle (Cambridge: Cambridge University Press, 1994)

Kulkarni, V. B., M. R. Jayakar (New Delhi: Government of India, 1970)

Lahiri, Shompa, Indians in Britain: Anglo-Indian Encounters, Race and Identity, 1880-1939 (London: Frank Cass, 2000)

Mitter, Partha, The Triumph of Modernism (London: Reaktion, 2007)

Nehru, Jawaharlal, An Autobiography: With Musings on Recent Events in India (London: Bodley Head, 1936)

See also
Free Press of India
University of Pune

References

1873 births
1959 deaths
Members of the Judicial Committee of the Privy Council
Members of the Constituent Assembly of India
Members of the Central Legislative Assembly of India
Marathi people
Indian members of the Privy Council of the United Kingdom
Indian National Congress politicians
Swaraj Party politicians
Lawyers in British India